Shahrak-e Mamur (also Romanized as Shahrak-e Māmūr) is a village in Sardasht Rural District of Rudasht District, Lordegan County, Chaharmahal and Bakhtiari province, Iran. At the 2006 census, its population was 2,343 in 428 households. The following census in 2011 counted 2,351 people in 478 households. The latest census in 2016 showed a population of 2,861 people in 694 households; it was the largest village in its rural district.

References 

Lordegan County

Populated places in Chaharmahal and Bakhtiari Province

Populated places in Lordegan County